Bazar Tombi (also Romanized as Bāzār Tombī) is a village in Tombi Golgir Rural District, Golgir District, Masjed Soleyman County, Khuzestan Province, Iran. At the 2006 census, its population was 937, in 222 families.

References 

Populated places in Masjed Soleyman County